Cameron Martin (born May 3, 2000) is an American soccer player who currently plays for the Michigan Wolverines.

Career
Martin joined the Seattle Sounders FC academy in 2014.  He made his debut for USL club Seattle Sounders FC 2 on July 8, 2017, in a 4–1 defeat to Real Monarchs.

Martin played for Ballard FC during the 2022 USL League Two season until he was recalled to Michigan.

References

External links
U.S. Soccer Development Academy bio
USSF Development Academy bio (demosphere)

2000 births
Living people
American soccer players
Tacoma Defiance players
Ballard FC players
Association football midfielders
Soccer players from Washington (state)
USL Championship players
USL League Two players
San Francisco Dons men's soccer players
People from Tukwila, Washington
Michigan Wolverines men's soccer players
Sportspeople from King County, Washington